America's Least Wanted is the full-length debut album by American rock band Ugly Kid Joe, released in September 1992. The title is a parody of the famous phrase "America's Most Wanted". It is the band's only album to feature drummer Mark Davis.

The album was a commercial success, charting three singles on the Mainstream Rock Tracks ("Neighbor", "Busy Bee" and "Cats in the Cradle"). "Everything About You" peaked at No. 3 in the UK Singles Chart and at No. 9 in the Billboard Hot 100. "Cats in the Cradle" (a 1974 folk rock song by Harry Chapin), also made the Billboard Hot 100, peaking at number six, earning the album two top 10 Billboard hit singles. The latter song also made it to No. 11 on the Top 40 Mainstream. As of 1995, the album has been certified double platinum.

Album information
Two of the songs had previously been included on the band's 1991 debut EP As Ugly as They Wanna Be though some small changes were made for this album: "Madman" was given a new vocal track while "Everything About You" was given a spoken intro by actress and then Saturday Night Live cast member Julia Sweeney as her questionably gendered character, Pat. It had previously been included in the SNL-based movie Wayne's World, which was released seven months before. Pat also appeared in the video for "Neighbor."

The difference between CD and LP versions of this album is that the song "Goddamn Devil" appears as its first track on the B-side.

Artwork
The album's original artwork depicts Ugly Kid Joe's mascot as the Statue of Liberty gesturing an upraised middle finger. Several national chains refused to sell the album in their stores due to this, and a "censored" version was manufactured for some retailers. The censored version depicts the Ugly Kid Joe mascot gagged, handcuffed in one hand (which is covered with duct tape) and tied in rope, while his legs are wrapped in chains. This image was originally used for the back cover of the album. The album's artwork, as well as all other promotional work and the As Ugly as They Wanna Be and The Very Best of Ugly Kid Joe: As Ugly as It Gets covers, was done by Whitfield Crane's high school friend Moish Brennan.

Reception

Despite being Ugly Kid Joe's most successful album, America's Least Wanted received mostly mixed reviews. The album received a positive review from AllMusic's Stephen Thomas Erlewine, who gave it four and a half stars out of five, and said that it "delivers a set of similar rockers and a handful of power ballads, including a revamped version of Harry Chapin's 'Cat's in the Cradle'" and described the music as a "mixture of fizzy, fuzzy riffs, sing-song melodies, and calculated obnoxiousness [that] isn't that offensive."

Deborah Frost of Entertainment Weekly, however, gave the album a C− and called it "a weak attempt to pad Ugly out to LP length with Lynyrd Skynyrd licks, Mister Rogers jokes, a scarily straight Harry Chapin cover ('Cat's in the Cradle'), and 'Mr. Recordman,' the most pathetic love song to a record company ever written. These kids should have quit while they were ahead."

Steve Hochman of Los Angeles Times gave it one-and-a-half stars out of four and called Ugly Kid Joe "generic MTV-rad-party dudes in baggies and Ts who seem to know how certain kinds of rock are supposed to sound but have no clue as to why. [...] The would-be centerpiece, 'Goddamn Devil,' has neither the irony nor the evil needed to revive that tired topic, despite a guest appearance by Judas Priest's knowing Rob Halford. Turning Harry Chapin's 'Cat's in the Cradle' into a power ballad was a bad idea to begin with; making it sound neither snotty nor particularly sincere only compounds the error. [...] America's least wanted?  Probably not.  Least interesting?  Now you're on target."

In popular culture
The music video for the track "Neighbor" was featured on an episode of Beavis and Butt-head.

In 2006, UK hardcore band Age of Kali released a demo CD with some of the lyrics from "Goddamn Devil" printed on the inner sleeve, as well as an alternative cover parodying the 'Ugly Kid' as Straight-Edge, only holding up two fingers with the X on his hand and holding a bottle of soda. The cover also read, "Margate's Least Wanted".

Track listing
All songs credited to Whitfield Crane, Cordell Crockett, Mark Davis, Klaus Eichstadt and Dave Fortman. Actual writers listed below.

"Neighbor" (Crane, Eichstadt) – 4:45
"Goddamn Devil" (Eichstadt) – 4:55
"Come Tomorrow" (Crane, Crockett, Eichstadt, Roger Lahr) – 4:55
"Panhandlin' Prince" (Crane, Eichstadt) – 5:42
"Busy Bee" (Fortman) – 4:10
"Don't Go" (Crane, Eric Phillips) – 4:33
"So Damn Cool" (Crane, Eichstadt) – 4:26
"Same Side" (Crane, Crockett, Eichstadt) – 4:51
"Cats in the Cradle" (Harry Chapin, Sandra Chapin) – 4:02
"I'll Keep Tryin'" (Eichstadt, Alan Reed) – 4:59
"Everything About You" (Crane, Eichstadt)– 4:20
"Madman" ('92 Remix) (Eichstadt)– 3:37
"Mr. Recordman" (Eichstadt) – 4:06

On the cassette pressings the track listing is:

Side one:
"Neighbor" (Crane, Eichstadt) – 4:43
"Come Tomorrow" (Crane, Crockett, Eichstadt, Roger Lahr) – 4:54
"Panhandlin' Prince" (Crane, Eichstadt) – 5:41
"Busy Bee" (Fortman) – 4:08
"Don't Go" (Crane, Eric Phillips) – 4:30
"So Damn Cool" (Crane, Eichstadt) – 4:24
Side two:
"Goddamn Devil" (Eichstadt) – 4:53
"Same Side" (Crane, Crockett, Eichstadt) – 4:48
"Cats in the Cradle" (Harry Chapin, Sandra Chapin) – 4:01
"I'll Keep Tryin'" (Eichstadt, Alan Reed) – 4:58
"Everything About You" (Crane, Eichstadt)– 4:20
"Madman" ('92 Remix) (Eichstadt)– 3:37
"Mr. Recordman" (Eichstadt) – 4:11

Personnel
 Whitfield Crane - vocals
 Cordell Crockett - bass, vocals, background vocals
 Klaus Eichstadt - guitar, vocals, background vocals, lead vocals on "Mr. Recordman"
 Dave Fortman - guitar, vocals, background vocals
 Mark Davis - percussion, drums

Additional personnel

 Jennifer Barry - background vocals
 Rob Halford - background vocals on "Goddamn Devil"
 Carrie Hamilton - piano on "Everything About You"
 Stephen Perkins - percussion
 Dean Pleasants - rhythm guitar on "Same Side"
 Julia Sweeney - spoken words on "Goddamn Devil" and "Everything About You"

 Jay Baumgardner - remixing
 Greg Calbi - mastering
 Mark Dodson - producer, engineer
 Michael Dodson - producer, engineer, mixing
 Ryan Dorn - producer
 Michael Levine - photography
 Randy Long - engineer, mixing
 Ugly Kid Joe - producer, remixing

Charts

Weekly charts

Year-end charts

Certifications

References

Ugly Kid Joe albums
1992 debut albums
Mercury Records albums
Albums produced by Mark Dodson